Guðmundur Steinsson  (born 18 July 1960) is an Icelandic former professional footballer who played as a forward. He made 19 appearances scoring eight goals for the Iceland national team. At club level he played for Knattspyrnufélagið Fram competing in the 1981–82 European Cup Winners' Cup and was the topscorer of the 1984 Úrvalsdeild with ten goals. With Víkingur he became topscorer of the 1991 Úrvalsdeild with 13 goals. He played for Víkingur also in the 1992–93 UEFA Champions League and scored in a match against CSKA Moscow.

References

Further reading
 
 

1960 births
Living people
Association football forwards
Gudmundur Steinsson
Gudmundur Steinsson
Gudmundur Steinsson
Place of birth missing (living people)
Gudmundur Steinsson
Gudmundur Steinsson
Gudmundur Steinsson
Gudmundur Steinsson
Gudmundur Steinsson
Gudmundur Steinsson
Gudmundur Steinsson
Icelandic expatriate footballers
Icelandic expatriate sportspeople in Germany
Expatriate footballers in Germany
Icelandic expatriate sportspeople in Sweden
Expatriate footballers in Sweden